Hibiscadelphus distans (Kauai hau kuahiwi) is an extremely rare species of flowering plant in the mallow family, Malvaceae, that is endemic to the island of Kauai in Hawaii. It is known as hau kuahiwi in Hawaiian, which means "upland Hibiscus tiliaceus." It is a bush or small tree with heart-shaped leaves and yellow flowers and grows at between 1,000 and 1,800 feet (300 and 550 m) in the remnants of native dry forests. Despite its rarity, it is believed to be the only surviving species in the genus Hibiscadelphus which is only known from Hawaii, the other five species having recently become extinct in the wild, some being known from only a single plant.

Description

The sepals form a calyx tube around the greenish yellow petals, which turn maroon as they age. The capsule dehisces when mature, releasing the seeds.

Habitat

The substrate is basaltic bedrock overlain by dry, crumbly red-brown soil. Associated plants include kukui (Aleurites moluccana), āhinahina (Artemisia kauaiensis), alahee (Psydrax odorata), lama (Diospyros sandwicensis), nehe (Lipochaeta connata), kōlea (Myrsine spp.), kuluī (Nototrichium sandwicense), ālaa (Pouteria sandwicensis), Sacramento Bur (Triumfetta semitriloba) and āulu (Sapindus oahuensis).

Conservation

There are only two known naturally occurring populations of H. distans, both in the Lower Koaie Canyon area, Puu Ka Pele Forest Reserve, with an estimated 20 wild and 150 reintroduced trees. The original population, found in 1972, was located in Koaie Canyon within the State-owned Nā Pali Kona Forest Reserve. In 1989, this population was destroyed by a landslide. A second population of fifty trees in the Hipalau Valley was destroyed in 1992 by Hurricane Iniki. Two botanical gardens in Hawaii have cultivated this plant species: McBryde Garden (National Tropical Botanical Garden) on Kauai and Waimea Valley on Oahu.

Despite the extreme rarity of H. distans, it actually has the largest wild population of any Hibiscadelphus species. Five of the other six species are extinct or extinct in the wild (four were only ever known from a single wild tree), the exception being H. woodii (also from Kauai), which is known from only four individuals.

References

External links
 
 

distans
Endemic flora of Hawaii
Biota of Kauai
Trees of Hawaii
Plants described in 1973